Christopher Hatton (1540–1591) was Lord Chancellor of England.

Christopher Hatton may also refer to:

 Christopher Hatton (died 1619) (1581–1619), MP for Buckingham, Bedford and Huntingdon
 Christopher Hatton, 1st Baron Hatton (1605–1670), MP and prominent Royalist during the English Civil War
 Christopher Hatton, 1st Viscount Hatton (1632–1706), English aristocrat and diplomat
 Chris Hatton, Australian politician